Hold Your Horses is a 1921 American silent comedy film directed by E. Mason Hopper and starring Tom Moore, Sylvia Ashton and Naomi Childers.

Cast
 Tom Moore as Daniel Canavan
 Sylvia Ashton as Hoonora Canavan
 Naomi Childers as Beatrice Newness
 Bertram Grassby as Rodman Cadbury
 Mortimer E. Stinson as Jim James
 Sidney Ainsworth as Horace Slayton

References

Bibliography
 Munden, Kenneth White. The American Film Institute Catalog of Motion Pictures Produced in the United States, Part 1. University of California Press, 1997.

External links
 

1921 films
1921 comedy films
1920s English-language films
American silent feature films
Silent American comedy films
American black-and-white films
Films directed by E. Mason Hopper
Goldwyn Pictures films
1920s American films